Birth of Jazz EP is American band Modey Lemon's self-released EP which predated the release of their 2008 album Season of Sweets. Some of the content of the album was recorded during the Season of Sweets sessions, which turned out to be the last sessions in the band's Brass Factory studio where they had recorded 3 albums.

Track listing
 "Rainbow Beard"
 "When It Rains, It Snows"
 "Vision Quest"
 "Half of a Hermaphrodite"

Personnel
Paul Quattrone - Drums, loops
Phil Boyd - Vocals, guitar and Moog synthesizer, loops
Jason Kirker - Bass, guitar, keyboards, loops

2008 EPs